United Progressive Alliance is an Indian political party coalition led by Indian National Congress.

Seat sharing summary 
For the 2009 Indian general election, the UPA's is an alliance led by Indian National Congress with following parties:

For the 2009 Indian general election, the UPA's candidates for the Lok Sabha constituencies are as follows.

Andhra Pradesh

Arunachal Pradesh

Assam

Bihar

Chhattisgarh

Goa

Gujarat

Haryana

Himachal Pradesh

Jammu and Kashmir

Jharkhand

Karnataka

Kerala

Madhya Pradesh

Maharashtra

Manipur

Meghalaya

Mizoram

Nagaland

Odisha

Punjab

Rajasthan

Sikkim

Tamil Nadu

Tripura

Uttar Pradesh

Uttarakhand

West Bengal

Union territory-wise candidate list

Andaman and Nicobar Islands

Chandigarh

Dadra and Nagar Haveli

Daman and Diu

NCT of Delhi

Lakshadweep

Puducherry

Notes

References

 
Lists of Indian political candidates
Indian National Congress